Dubrowna or Dubrovno is a small town in Vitebsk Region, northern Belarus, located on the Dnieper River. Dubrowna is the administrative centre of Dubrowna District

Etymology
The toponym originates from a Proto-Slavic term for an oak forest, which may explain the inclusion of oak leaves and acorns in the town's coat of arms.

History
In the 19th century Dubrowna was a centre for weaving. The town had a significant Jewish community that in 1898 formed more than half of its population.

During World War II Dubrovno was heavily affected.  It was occupied by German forces July 17–20, 1941, and the town's Jews were killed. It was the scene of considerable partisan activity. From October 1943 to June 1944 it was at or near the front line, and was not finally reoccupied by Soviet forces until June 26, 1944.

Dubrowna hosts an annual folk song and dance festival, "Dnepr voices in Dubrovno".

Notable people
Harry Batshaw (1902–1984), jurist
Israel Dov Frumkin (1850–1914), journalist
Charles Jaffé (c.1879 - 1941), chess master
Brothers Yakov Polyakov, Samuel Polyakov (1837–1888) and Lazar Polyakov (1843–1914), businessmen
Kazimierz Siemienowicz (c.1600 - c.1651), military engineer and rocket pioneer
Anna Tumarkin (1875–1951), professor of philosophy
Menachem Ussishkin (1863–1941), Zionist
Zvi Zeitlin (1922–2012), violinist

References

External links
 Dubroŭna Raion Executive Committee
 Global Anabaptist Mennonite Encyclopaedia Online
 Jewish Encyclopedia
 The murder of the Jews of Dubroŭna during World War II, at Yad Vashem website
 

Towns in Belarus
Populated places in Vitebsk Region
Dubrowna District
Vitebsk Voivodeship
Goretsky Uyezd
Populated places on the Dnieper in Belarus